The Chittenden Memorial Bridge is a  concrete and steel arch bridge across the Yellowstone River just upstream from the Upper Yellowstone Falls in Yellowstone National Park. First constructed in 1903 as a Melan arch bridge by park engineer Captain Hiram M. Chittenden of the US Army Corps of Engineers, the bridge was known as Chittenden Bridge from 1912 until 1963, when it was replaced with the current structure. This bridge provides road access from the Grand Loop Road to the secondary road on the south rim of the Grand Canyon of the Yellowstone that allows visitors to see the upper and lower Yellowstone Falls from the south rim.

History

The first bridge on this site was built in 1903. Chittenden describes the process in his 1915 history of Yellowstone:

By 1912, six years after Chittenden left his duties as park engineer, the bridge had become known as the Chittenden Bridge. In 1961, after a lot of public protest, the National Park Service tore down the original bridge and replaced it with a more modern, wider structure suitable for the type of vehicle traffic the park was experiencing. In an opening ceremony in 1963, the new bridge was christened the Chittenden Memorial Bridge.

See also
List of bridges documented by the Historic American Engineering Record in Wyoming

References

Further reading

External links

Open-spandrel deck arch bridges in the United States
Bridges completed in 1963
Buildings and structures in Park County, Wyoming
Buildings and structures in Yellowstone National Park in Wyoming
Historic American Engineering Record in Wyoming
Road bridges in Wyoming
Steel bridges in the United States
Concrete bridges in the United States
1903 establishments in Wyoming
Bridges over the Yellowstone River